Lieutenant General Koos Bisschoff  is a former artillery officer who served as Chief of Staff Planning in the SADF

Early life

He was born in the Cape Province and matriculated from Trompsburg High School before joining the SA Army Gymnasium.

Military career

He was an instructor at the School of Artillery & Armour. He served as Directing Staff at the Army College, Chief Instructor Staff Duties. He served as Officer Commanding School of Artillery from 1973 - 1976. He saw action in the Border War as a Sector Commander. Commandant Army College, OaC North Western Command, Inspector General SA Army in 1986. GOC Eastern Transvaal. Chief of Staff Operations and finally as Chief of Staff Planning from 1992. until retirement in 1993.

Awards and decorations

References

|-

|-

|-

Possibly living people
Year of birth missing
South African Army generals
Afrikaner people
South African people of Dutch descent
South African military personnel of the Border War
Freedom Front Plus politicians
Stellenbosch University alumni